Weissella diestrammenae is a Gram-positive, facultatively anaerobic and non-motil bacterium from the genus of Weissella which has been isolated from the gut of the camel cricket Diestrammena coreana in Korea.

References

 

Bacteria described in 2013
Weissella